Tabernaemontana attenuata is a species of plant in the family Apocynaceae. It is found in Trinidad, Venezuela, Suriname, and French Guinea.

References

attenuata